Saginaw High School opened in 2005 as the second high school serving the Eagle Mountain-Saginaw Independent School District (EMS-ISD). It is a 5-A school located in Saginaw, Texas, United States. The mascot is the Rough Rider, and the school colors are cardinal red (#97233F) and Vegas Gold (#FFB612). The principal is Cynthia Webber. Enrollment is just shy of 2,000 students.

Athletics
Saginaw High Rough Riders enjoy opportunities to participate in a number of sports, including football, baseball, softball, volleyball, basketball, golf, wrestling, gymnastics, tennis, swimming, cross country, and track & field.

Although most of the athletic programs have enjoyed success, the football team has had few successful seasons. The team posted a 1–9 record for the 2011 season, which was an improvement over the 2010 0-10 season that saw the team give up 338 more points than it scored.  They cut the point differential down to 190 in the 2011 season. In the 2009 season, the team played in its first and last ever playoff game, despite only winning 4 games. In the 2012 season, however, the football team showed improvement in its win–loss ratio, winning 8 out of 11 games during the regular season, eventually making the playoffs. The team was under Coach Mike Peters going into the 2013 season. Sadly in 2017 they didn't pull through and lost every game.

The 2009 boys' soccer team made its first-ever playoff appearance. Coaches Sam Trevino, Jason Carnley and Jason Crawford guided the team to a playoff berth with a fourth-place finish in district play.

Men's Gymnastics 

The men's gymnastics team, led by Coach Eric Briley, placed sixth at the state meet in 2010 and improved their placement to third in 2011. The Saginaw gymnastics team then went on to be the 2012 and 2013 State Championship team. Leading contributors were Justin Stringfellow, Steven Ramirez, Grant Wooldridge, Jacob Doest, and Clay Brightwell. Justin Stringfellow placed within the top three on nearly every event and became a state champion on the vault event.

After winning back-to-back State Champion titles, they came in second in 2014, 2015, and 2016. In 2017, they were expected to win, but the team suffered several setbacks on day 2 of the meet, and they ended in third place. Maison Leck earned an individual State Champion title on the parallel bars in both 2016 and 2017.

In 2018, the team was led by two of the top gymnasts in the state of Texas, Sophomore Joseph Bryant and Junior Tyler Naukam. They won the State Championship as a team, and Naukam was the State Champion on parallel bars with Bryant named runner-up. In addition, Naukam was the runner up on floor and vault and came in fourth in the all-around. Bryant, who came in third in the all-around, received All-State recognition in the all-around and on floor, pommel, vault, and high bar.

Again led by Bryant and Naukam in 2019, the team won their 11th consecutive District Championship and 10th consecutive Regional Championship. They then went on to win a second back-to-back State Champion title. Bryant and Naukam were co-champions on floor, and both came in third in the all-around. Bryant was also the State Champion on rings, and Naukam was the State Champion on vault. All-State recognition for Naukam included pommel, parallel bars, and high bar. Bryant's All-State recognition included pommel, vault, parallel bars, and high bar.

The season leading up to the 2020 championship was looking excellent for the Saginaw team, with everyone sure they would become 3Peat State Champions. Led by their captain, senior Joseph Bryant, the team was unstoppable and dominated at every meet. By the end of the regular season, the team was ahead of the second-place team by over 8 points and ahead of the third-place team by 17.9 points. And Bryant was ranked number one in every event, including the all-around. But then the COVID-19 pandemic hit, shutting down schools and sports events around the world. This unprecedented situation left the Texas High School Gymnastics Coaches Association (THSGCA) unsure how to handle the unprecedented situation. They decided they could not name any State Champions, as the State Championship meet (as well as Districts and Regionals) had to be canceled. Instead, they decided to officially rank the teams and gymnasts based on the regular-season scores.

For 2020, the final rankings by THSGCA placed Saginaw in first place. They also officially ranked Joseph Bryant as number one in the state on every event, including the all-around. Joseph made Texas history by being the first gymnasts to ever receive 8 first-place rankings. THSGCA also awarded All-State honors to numerous Saginaw gymnasts, including Bradley Webster, Brandon Justice, Nico Bravo, Logan Jeffrey, Joseph McKenzie, and Caleb Walrond. In addition, THSGCA created a brand new ranking to recognize Bryant's excellence in gymnastics, and they honored him with Elite All-State Gymnast status.

As of the end of the 2019-20 season, the gymnastics team remained undefeated for three years.

Fine arts

Spirit of Saginaw Band
The Spirit of Saginaw Band was founded in 2005. It began its first marching season with 80 members and participated at the Plano East Marching Festival, earning a Division II at UIL Region. In 2006 the band grew to 130 members and participated in Bands of America, the Plano East Marching Festival and earned a Division I at UIL region. In 2007 the band had 160 members and won its first marching competition of the year, the Golden Triangle Marching Classic, and received its second top-three placement. The color guard and percussion participated in the Crowley Guard & Drumline Competition. The guard placed 1st, with Best Weapon Line and Best Color Guard. Percussion placed second. They tied for first (with the Azle marching band) in the UIL Area A marching competition and received 14th place at the UIL State Marching Championships in San Antonio. In 2008 the band placed 2nd at the Aledo Unleash the Sound Competition (eventually winning this contest in later years), received a Division I at UIL Region and placed 3rd at the USSBA State Championships, including 1st Place Color Guard and 1st Place Percussion. The Guard & Percussion participated again at Crowley, where the guard placed 2nd, 3rd overall and Percussion won a caption for best snare line. Percussion attended PASIC (Percussive Arts Society International Convention) November 5–8 and placed 6th out of 10 bands in their division. The Saginaw Band also received the UIL Sweepstakes Award five years in a row, beginning in 2008. The concert bands are currently under the direction of Matt Pearson and Alyson Holley. Percussion director is Jenn Giba. Colorguard/Winterguard directors are Ryan Lu and Art Grossman-Juhl. Visual director is Jonathon Paredez.

For 2005–2006, drum majors were sophomores Maegan Davis Jordan Yamada.  The show for that year was Genesis, featuring excerpts from Dvorak's "New World Symphony."

2006–2007 drum majors were sophomore Brad Baker and juniors Maegan Davis and Jordan Yamada.  The 2006 show was Descent Into Madness, based loosely around the plot of the Stanley Kubrick film The Shining.

2007–2008 drum majors were juniors Brad Baker and Brittany Harris and seniors Maegan Davis and Jordan Yamada. The show for this year, A Purple Heart, was a tribute to the soldiers who fought and died in World War II. It featured music from the Mel Gibson film We Were Soldiers

2008–2009 drum majors were seniors Brad Baker and Brittany Harris and junior McKenna Johnson and Courtnee Morton. The 2008 program was Lost, based on the television series by J. J. Abrams of the same name, featuring the music of Michael Giacchino

2009–2010 drum majors were seniors McKenna Johnson, Courtnee Morton and Lauren Daughhetee and juniors Morgan Mitchell and Samantha Le. The 2009 program was Romeo & Juliet, which included four movements.

2010–2011 drum majors were seniors Samantha Le and Morgan Mitchell, and juniors Lauren Robertson and Phil Esmaili. The band consisted of over 270 members for this season. The marching program was titled Nosferatu: A Symphony of Terror, including pieces from Copeland's ballet Grohg, with music arrangements by Timothy J. Gorgas.

2011-2012 drum majors were seniors Lauren Robertson and Phil Esmaili and juniors Alexis Brandt and Sarah Vowell. The marching program was titled Rise Up, featuring music from Johan de Meij's Symphony No. 1, "The Lord of The Rings."

2012–2013 drum majors were seniors Sarah Vowell, Karla Melendez and Alexis Brandt, and junior Steffani Vera. The marching program was titled Arctic Circle and featured music by Coldplay and Jean Sibelius, arranged by Timothy Gorgas. The program included the four movements "Northern Quest", "Arctic Blizzard", "Aurora Borealis" and "Perpetual Twilight".

Originally a 4A program, the Spirit of Saginaw band was reclassified to 5A as of the 2010–2011 school year.

In 2015 Gabby Salinas was named to the 5-A Texas All-State Band, first chair.

Competition programs by year:

 2005–2006: Genesis
 2006–2007: Descent into Madness
 2007–2008: A Purple Heart (4A state bound)
 2008–2009: LOST
 2009–2010: Romeo and Juliet (4A state bound)
 2010–2011: Nosferatu: A Symphony of Terror (5A state bound)
 2011–2012: Rise Up! "The Lord of the Rings"
 2012–2013: Arctic Circle
 2013-2014: The Life Aquatic
 2014-2015: Outbreak
 2015-2016: Heart of the Phoenix 
 2016-2017: Stained Glass
 2017-2018: Through the Keys
 2018-2019: Classic Rach
 2019-2020: Cash

Saginaw High School Theater
The Saginaw High School Theater is directed by Lee Neisler and Amy Dale.

The program was formerly led by Jeffrey Smith from the school's opening until 2010. The program was then led by David Kersh until 2012.

The program was featured in the first season of Encore! on Disney+, where they recreated their 2007 performance of Beauty and the Beast.

Performances by year:
 2009 musical: Once upon a Mattress
 2010 musical: Little Shop of Horrors
 2011 one-act play: Over the River and Through the Woods - regional finalist (top 24 in the state)
 2011 musical: Grease
 2012 musical: The Wizard of Oz
 2013 musical: The 25th Annual Putnam County Spelling Bee
 2014 one-act play: Moon Over Buffalo - Alternate to State
 2016 musical: Sussical the Musical
 2017 musical: A Christmas Carol
 2018 musical: Lucky Stiff
 2019 musical: Annie

Starsteppers dance team
The award-winning Starsteppers dance team perform at SHS varsity football games, pep rallies, basketball games, community events, competitions and camps.

Cheerleader controversy
The Fort-Worth Star Telegram reported on April 8, 2010 that a group of cheerleaders from the school were disciplined after spiking their teammates' soda cans with urine. The incident happened during the previous winter when at least one of the cheerleaders urinated into a cup and then mixed its contents with soda bought at a nearby restaurant. At least two girls were given in-school suspensions and others received lesser punishments, according to the Star-Telegram. The girls were barred from cheerleading events for the rest of the school year, but were allowed to return the following year.

References

External links
 
 Saginaw High School Athletics
 Spirit of Saginaw Band Website

Eagle Mountain-Saginaw Independent School District high schools